Chedan (also Romanized as Chedān; also known as Chedān-e Bālā) is a village in Qaen Rural District, in the Central District of Qaen County, South Khorasan Province, Iran. At the 2006 census, its population was 189, in 44 families.

References 

Populated places in Qaen County